Lake Nemenjiche is a freshwater body of the southern part of Eeyou Istchee Baie-James, in the administrative region of Nord-du-Québec , in the province of Quebec, Canada.

Forestry is the main economic activity of the sector. Recreational tourism activities come second.

The hydrographic slope of Lake Nemenjiche is accessible through a forest road coming from the Northeast, coming off route 167. The surface of Lake Nemenjiche is usually frozen from early November to mid-May, however, safe ice circulation is generally from mid-November to mid-April.

Geography 

Of elongated shape in the North-South direction, this lake comprises about forty islands. It is supplied by the North by the discharge of a few small unidentified lakes and by the West by five unidentified lakes.

Lake Nemenjiche is the head lake of the river of the same name. The mouth of this lake is located at the bottom of a bay on the West Bank at:
 South of the mouth of the Nemenjiche River (confluence with Obatogamau Lakes);
 Southeast of the mouth of the “rivière à l’Eau Jaune” (Eau Jaune Lake) which is integrated with Obatogamau Lakes;
 Southeast of the mouth of the Obatogamau River (confluence with the Chibougamau River);
 East of the mouth of Goéland Lake (Waswanipi River);
 South of downtown Chibougamau;
 south-east of the village center of Chapais, Quebec

The main hydrographic slopes near Lake Nemenjiche are:
North side: Nemenjiche River, Chibougamau River, Obatogamau Lakes;
East side: Rohault Lake, Normandin River, Coquille River (Normandin River);
South side: Opawica River, Cawcot River, Ventadour River;
West side: Opawica River, Roy River, Surprise Lake.

Toponymy
The toponym "lac Nemenjiche" was made official on December 5, 1968 by the Commission de toponymie du Québec, when it was created.

Notes and references

See also 

Nottaway River, a watercourse
Matagami Lake, a body of water
Chibougamau River, a watercourse
List of lakes in Canada

Eeyou Istchee James Bay
Lakes of Nord-du-Québec
Nottaway River drainage basin